Edgewood Management LLC is an employee-owned registered investment advisor in the public equity markets of the United States.  The firm follows a growth-oriented strategy based on intensive balance sheet analysis that is focused on building a portfolio of large cap growth stocks with a three to five year investment horizon. Originally focused on individual investors and family groups, Edgewood has expanded to serve an institutional clientele.

History 
The firm is headed by president Alan W. Breed, whose father founded the firm in 1974. As of June 2016, it managed 22 stocks with approximately $60 billion in capital under management. The firm has invested in companies such as Snap Inc., PayPal, Visa Inc., Nvidia, and Intuit.

References

American companies established in 1974
Financial services companies established in 1974
Employee-owned companies of the United States
Investment management companies of the United States
1974 establishments in New York (state)